Beehunter is an unincorporated community in Greene County, Indiana, in the United States.

History
Beehunter took its name from Beehunter Creek.

References

Unincorporated communities in Greene County, Indiana
Unincorporated communities in Indiana